Socrates is an extinct town in Monroe County, in the U.S. state of Georgia.

History
The community was named after Socrates (c. 469 BC – 399 BC), the ancient Athenian philosopher.

References

Geography of Monroe County, Georgia
Ghost towns in Georgia (U.S. state)